I Saw the Devil is a 2010 South Korean action thriller film directed by Kim Jee-woon and written by Park Hoon-jung. Starring Lee Byung-hun and Choi Min-sik, the film follows NIS agent Kim Soo-hyun (Lee), who embarks on a quest of revenge when his wife is brutally murdered by the psychopathic serial killer Jang Kyung-chul (Choi). I Saw the Devil made its premiere in the United States at the 2011 Sundance Film Festival and had a limited U.S theatrical release.

I Saw the Devil was Choi Min-sik's first major role since the changes to the Korean screen quota system.

Plot
One night, a school-bus driver named Jang Kyung-chul encounters a pregnant woman named Jang Joo-yun and offers to fix her flat tire. After beating her unconscious, Kyung-chul dismembers Joo-yun at his home, and while doing so, Joo-yun's ring falls. Kyung-chul ignores it and scatters the body parts into a local stream. When a boy discovers one of Joo-yun's ears, the police arrive en masse to conduct a search, led by Section Chief Oh and Squad Chief Jang, Joo-yun's devastated father. The victim's fiancé, Kim Soo-hyun, an NIS officer is also present and vows to take revenge against the murderer.

Soo-hyun learns of the four suspects from Squad Chief Jang and proceeds to privately torture and interrogate two of them. Upon searching the home of Kyung-chul, the third suspect, Soo-hyun finds Joo-yun's engagement ring, proving that Kyung-chul was the perpetrator. A short time later, Kyung-chul brings a schoolgirl home and assaults her. Soo-hyun beats him unconscious. Rather than killing Kyung-chul and being done with it, Soo-hyun decides to shove a GPS tracker down his throat, allowing him to see Kyung-chul's location in real time and to listen to his conversations.

Waking up injured, Kyung-chul walks along the road and is offered a ride by a taxi already containing one passenger. Upon getting in, and correctly guessing that the driver and passenger are in fact two bandits intending to rob and murder him, one being Soo-hyun's unvisited fourth suspect, he strikes out preemptively and kills them both. Afterward, he finds the body of the real taxi-driver in the trunk. Kyung-chul throws out all three bodies, and drives to a small town where he sexually assaults a nurse. Soo-hyun arrives to subdue him and slashes his Achilles tendon before releasing him once more.

Kyung-chul visits the home of his friend Tae-joo, a murderer and cannibal. After explaining his situation to Tae-joo, the latter remarks that whoever is after him must be the relative of one of his victims. Kyung-chul consequently deduces Soo-hyun's identity after recalling Joo-yun's engagement ring, which Soo-hyun had put on before attacking him previously. Soo-hyun arrives and incapacitates both murderers along with Tae-joo's girlfriend Se-jung. The next day, Tae-joo and Se-jung, still unconscious, are arrested by the police and sent to the hospital.

Soo-hyun's trusted subordinate arranges for Soo-hyun and Kyung-chul to evade the police and receive treatment for their wounds at a separate facility. The barely conscious Kyung-chul hears Soo-hyun and the subordinate talking about the transmitter. Soo-hyun releases Kyung-chul again, but the latter outsmarts Soo-hyun, slashing the throat of a pharmacist while stealing laxatives which he uses to remove the transmitter, then plants it on a driver at a truck stop that he viciously beats. Soo-hyun enters Tae-joo's hospital room to question him, and learns too late that Kyung-chul is going after Squad Chief Jang and his other daughter Jang Se-yun. Enraged, Soo-hyun breaks Tae-joo's jaw.

Kyung-chul arrives at the house of Jang, and proceeds to brutally assault him with a dumb-bell, then kill Jang Se-yun. Shortly after, Kyung-chul attempts to avoid Soo-hyun's revenge by surrendering to the police. However, Soo-hyun drives by and kidnaps Kyung-chul right in front of the police's eyes. Taking him to the earlier warehouse, Soo-hyun tortures him, places him under the makeshift guillotine, and leaves him holding a rope between his teeth to keep the blade from falling.

Though he mocks Soo-hyun, Kyung-chul begins to panic when he learns that his son and elderly parents, whom he had abandoned some time ago, have arrived and are trying to visit him. As his family opens the door despite his muffled protests, it triggers another mechanism set up by Soo-hyun that drops the blade and brutally beheads Kyung-chul in front of his family. With Kyung-chul finally dead, Soo-hyun, who was listening through the transmitter some distance away, breaks down in tears.

Cast
 Lee Byung-hun as Kim Soo-hyun, an agent in the National Intelligence Service
 Choi Min-sik as Jang Kyung-chul, an academy bus driver and serial killer
 Oh San-ha as Jang Joo-yun, Soo-hyun's fiancée
 Jeon Gook-hwan as Squad Chief Jang, Joo-yun's father
 Kim Yoon-seo as Jang Se-yun, Joo-yun's sister
 Chun Ho-jin as Section Chief Oh, the leader of the police
 Choi Moo-sung as Tae-joo, Kyung-chul's friend
 Kim In-seo as Se-jung, Tae-joo's girlfriend
 Yoon Chae-young as Han Song-yi, nurse
 Nam Bo-ra as Section Chief Oh's daughter
 Jung Ji-yoon as Junior high female student

Alternate versions
The Korea Media Rating Board forced Kim to recut the film for its theatrical release, objecting to its violent content. The film received a "Restricted" rating twice, preventing any sort of release in theatres or on home video and promotions as well. Seven cuts were made with the total runtime of removed material between eighty and ninety seconds.

Release
I Saw the Devil was released in South Korea on August 12, 2010. The film premiered at the 2011 Sundance Film Festival on 21 January 2011. It also received screenings at several other international film festivals, including the Fantasporto Film Festival, Toronto International Film Festival, Sitges Film Festival, San Sebastian Film Festival and the London Korean Film Festival.

North American distribution rights were acquired by Magnet Releasing which released it on a limited basis on March 4, 2011. Optimum Releasing distributed the film in the United Kingdom.

Critical reception
The website's "Critics Consensus" says the film is "Never flinching during its descent into depravity, [...] a pulverizing thriller that will give bloody satisfaction to audiences who like their revenge served with fiery rage." On Metacritic the film received "Generally favorable reviews," with a weighted average of 67 out of 100, based on 19 reviews.

Jeannette Catsoulis of The New York Times wrote, "From an unexpectedly moving first act to a hilariously disgusting sojourn with Kyung-chul’s cannibal pal, Mr. Kim and his cinematographer, Lee Mogae, retain complete control of the film’s fluctuating tones and impressive set pieces." Mark Olson of the Los Angeles Times wrote, "There is all the violent mayhem, for certain, but the thing that sets I Saw the Devil apart is its undercurrent of real emotion and how unrelentingly sad it can be." Rob Nelson from Variety magazine stated, "Repugnant content, grislier than the ugliest torture porn, ought to have made the film unwatchable, but it doesn't, simply because Kim's picture is so beautifully filmed, carefully structured and viscerally engaging." Bloody Disgusting's Brad Miska gave it a rating of four-and-a-half out of five, writing: "I could talk for hours about I Saw the Devil, but nothing I can say will ever do it justice. The film is an experience; it's something that will have you emotionally invested in the characters, while also covering your eyes at the extreme violence," whereas Empire rated the film four out of five, stating, "This gleefully black horror-thriller is a very classy follow-up to The Good, the Bad, the Weird for Kim Jee-Woon." Phelim O'Neil from The Guardian wrote, "There's no shortage of Korean revenge-thrillers, but this, along with the recent The Man from Nowhere, proves there is plenty of life left in the genre" and gave it a four star rating out five.

Not all critics were favorable towards the film's brutality; Mark Jenkins of The Washington Post wrote, "Director Kim Jee-woon is a born filmmaker, even if this script (written by Park Hoon-jung and adapted by Kim) is unworthy of his efforts" and rated it two out of five stars. Elizabeth Kerr of The Hollywood Reporter wrote that, "On any number of levels, Devil is troublesome at best, offensive at worst."

In 2014, Rolling Stone magazine put I Saw the Devil in the top 20 of "the scariest movies you've never seen." In 2019, Jim Vorel of Paste named it the best horror film of 2010, writing of its ultimate conclusion: "It's one of the great, empty victories of horror cinema in the 2010s, and should be seen by a larger audience."

Awards and nominations

Home media
The film was released on DVD as a three-disc set, which contains both the Korean theatrical version and international version, in South Korea on 29 March 2011. The DVD and Blu-ray for the US and Canadian markets were released on May 10, 2011.

References

External links 
 
 
 
 
 

2010 films
2010s vigilante films
2010 action thriller films
South Korean action thriller films
Splatter films
South Korean serial killer films
Films about cannibalism
South Korean films about revenge
Films about kidnapping
Films about rape
Films set in Seoul
Films shot in South Korea
Films directed by Kim Jee-woon
Showbox films
2010s Korean-language films
Rape and revenge films
South Korean films remade in other languages
South Korean vigilante films
South Korean chase films
Films about stalking
2010s South Korean films